The Laidley Valley Branch Railway was opened on 19 April 1911 and covering a mere 11 kilometres, the Laidley Valley Branch Railway was one of the shortest in Queensland, Australia.

Branching from the Main line at Laidley and passing through Cooper's Hill, Goothenda, Paree and Kullee, it terminated at Mulgowie. The line was the culmination of 30 years agitation to access the rich agricultural area along Laidley Creek.

The line was never profitable, servicing an agricultural valley with a low population density.  The initial twice-daily service was reduced to once daily in 1918 and reduced again to a twice weekly service in the 1930s. The line reached its greatest popularity in 1914 when 1,285 people travelled on the line - by 1950 the average use was one passenger every three weeks. Freight averaged ninety tons a year in the early years, but by the late 1930s this had dropped to 38 tons a week. By 1954, there was barely enough freight to fill a single wagon. A possible extension to Thornton did not materialise, and once an all-weather road was constructed the uneconomic branch closed in 1955, although 1.3 kilometres of the line to the Laidley cattle yards continued in service until 1969.

See also

Rail transport in Queensland

References

External links
 1925 map of the Queensland railway system

Closed railway lines in Queensland
Railway lines opened in 1911
Railway lines closed in 1955
Lockyer Valley Region
1911 establishments in Australia